Paula Todoran (born 9 June 1985 in Zalău) is a Romanian long-distance runner.

Career highlights

European Championships
2007 - 4th, 10,000 m (under-23)

Personal bests

External links

1985 births
Living people
Romanian female long-distance runners
People from Zalău
World Athletics Championships athletes for Romania
Athletes (track and field) at the 2016 Summer Olympics
Olympic athletes of Romania
Romanian female marathon runners